Kartvlis Deda (Mother of Kartvel or Mother of  Georgian) is a monument in Georgia's capital Tbilisi.

The statue was erected on the top of Sololaki hill in 1958, the year Tbilisi celebrated its 1500th anniversary. Prominent Georgian sculptor Elguja Amashukeli designed the twenty-metre aluminium figure of a woman in Georgian national dress.

Symbolism
She symbolizes the Georgian national character: in her left hand she holds a bowl of wine to greet those who come as friends, and in her right hand is a sword for those who come as enemies.

History
In 1966 Elguja Amashukeli was awarded the Shota Rustaveli State Prize for this sculpture. He called the statue "Capital", and it commonly became known as "Mother of Kartvel". The accessories of the sculpture, the cup with wine and sword, are an expression of the history of our city, Tbilisi, the endless battles with the enemies and the welcoming of friendly guests.

The original statue erected on Sololaki Hill in 1958 was a wooden allegorical statue that would temporarily decorate the capital. Later it was decided to become permanent and the wood texture was covered with aluminum in 1963 to limit environmental damage. In 1997, the old statue was replaced with a new one.

Gallery

See also
List of tallest statues
Mother Armenia

References

Colossal statues
Monuments and memorials in Tbilisi
National symbols of Georgia (country)
1958 sculptures
Aluminium sculptures
Georgian words and phrases
National personifications